Nordine Zouareg (born July 1, 1962) is a French-American fitness personality, high-performance coach and author who has won Mr. France, Mr. Europe, Mr. World, and Mr. Universe in 1986. He currently resides in Tucson, Arizona with his two children.

Background

Early life
Nordine Zouareg was born in Algeria to Bedouin parents in the back of a French army truck. He was a sickly infant with a birth weigh of two pounds and constantly fell ill. In order to seek advanced medical care for their newborn, Zouareg's parents took him to France where he was diagnosed with rickets. Zouareg's parents settled in France where he spent a major of part of his childhood in the suburbs of Paris with the 13 siblings that followed him. Poor health eclipsed a major part of Zouareg's childhood, resulting in a weak constitution which made him an easy target for school bullies.

Introduction to bodybuilding

During his teens, he focused on becoming a gymnast. In his struggle to become a successful gymnast, Zouareg broke his wrists and moved into the world of professional body building. He claims that as his physical presence improved his resolve to become a body builder strengthened. In 1985 Zouareg won his first title of Mr. France.

Awards and recognition
Zouareg was overall winner of the World Amateur Bodybuilding Association (WABBA) in 1986. Zouareg added the titles of Mr. France, Mr. Europe and Mr. Universe twice, once in 1986 and once in 1988. In 1987 Zouareg turned pro and joined the International Federation of BodyBuilders (IFBB). Shortly afterward, he took second place at the Italian Grand Prix in Rimini and 15th at the Night of Champions in New York, both in 1991. In March 1995, the U.S. Department of Justice awarded Zouareg with an Alien of Extraordinary Ability Status (EB-A1). To get this status, an alien must be able to show extraordinary ability in the sciences, arts, education, business, or athletics through sustained national or international acclaim.

The "Mind Over Body" philosophy
In an effort to promote what he calls a "mind over body" philosophy, Zouareg moved to the United States to reach a wider audience.

In 2007, Zouareg's Mind Over Body was released by Springboard Publishing. The book details Zouareg's life experience, the personal struggles and challenges he has overcome to succeed in life, and a detailed explanation of the positive influence of "mind over body". Zouareg worked as fitness manager at the Miraval, Life in Balance Resort & Spa in Tucson, Arizona from 1999 to 2004, where he created their fitness program, and now works independently as Miraval's professional fitness coach and has his own business as a motivational speaker toward fitness and health.

In 2021 Zouareg’s book InnerFitness was published by SkyHorse Publishing to address mental health stigma and offer readers different tools to cope and overcome fear and anxiety.

Books
 
 
 Review (third from bottom) of Mind Over Body in Publishers Weekly 4/16/2007, Vol. 254 Issue 16, p47-48.

Additional sources
 Arizona Star, by Bob Oro, January 8, 2009, "Nordine Zouareg's international experience with health and bodybuilding drew me in — Zouareg is a former Mr. Universe — but his understanding of lifestyle changes blew me away."
 Armchair Interviews, by Cerri Ellis, review of Mind Over Body: "...oddly enough I enjoyed the stretching exercises, even found them relaxing. The more strenuous exercises…well, I’m still working on those"

References

External links

 Nordine Zouareg Official Site
 Nordine Zouareg at Muscle Memory
 New England School of Whole Health Education, "Nordine Zouareg’s personal story is an inspirational one"
 Sante-et-Sport magazine, Number 250 cover "Nordine Zouareg", 240 cover Says "Champion of the world, Nordine Zouareg" on the cover
 Night of Champions New York, 1991 (scorecard)
 Mr. Europe. Lyon France, 1986 (scorecard)
 IFBB Pro Member letter
 WABBA Mr. Universe federation letter
 Mr. World & Mr. Universe 1986 Championships, Berne, Switzerland (score card)

Living people
1962 births
People from M'Sila Province
Bodybuilders
Algerian sportspeople
21st-century Algerian people